The W69 was a United States nuclear warhead used in the AGM-69 SRAM (Short-Range Attack Missile).

It was designed in the early 1970s and entered the U.S. stockpile in 1972. The weapon was retired between 1991 and 1994.  About 1,500 warheads were produced.

The weapons were partially dismantled by 1999 at the Pantex Plant, with only the canned subassemblies (CSA) of the secondary stage of the weapons remaining. Dismantlement of the CSAs at the Y-12 National Security Complex began in 2012 and was completed by 2016.

The W69 warhead is believed to be derived from the B61 nuclear bomb design.

Specifications

See also
List of nuclear weapons
B61 Family

References

Nuclear warheads of the United States
Military equipment introduced in the 1970s